The term Mount Lyell Railway was one of the terms used for the railway operated by the Mount Lyell Mining and Railway Company between 1899 and 1963. 

Many name variations were used for identifying the line, the most common being the Abt railway.
After closing of the railway, most of the railway infrastructure was removed, except for a few buildings and bridges.

History 
Surveying for the railway line began in 1892. A bill for construction of the railway was introduced into the Tasmanian House of Assembly in November 1892. A further survey was undertaken in March 1893 to determine the best route and in June the same year preparations were made to float the Mount Lyell Mining and Railway Company to undertake the work.

Mine lease railways 

Mount Lyell company had railways on its lease that were separate from the mainline between Queenstown and Strahan.
The company constructed a haulage line to the mining operations on the ridge between Mount Owen and Mount Lyell in the early decades of operations.

The company had small gauge lines to move materials on the lease.

In later stages of operations, the mine had an underground railway to haul ore to the processing facilities on the lease.

2000s 

The reconstructed railway over the most of the original formation with some variations:

2002 operated under the name of the Abt Wilderness Railway.

2013 Federal Hotels withdrew from operations

2014 reopened as the West Coast Wilderness Railway

References

Mount Lyell Mining and Railway Company

1899 establishments in Australia

1963 disestablishments in Australia